Hendrik Ooms  also known as Henk Ooms (18 March 1916 – 6 December 1993) was a Dutch cyclist. He won a silver medal in Men's tandem at the 1936 Summer Olympics.

See also
 List of Dutch Olympic cyclists

References

1916 births
1993 deaths
Dutch male cyclists
Olympic cyclists of the Netherlands
Cyclists at the 1936 Summer Olympics
Olympic silver medalists for the Netherlands
Olympic medalists in cycling
People from Haarlemmerliede en Spaarnwoude
Medalists at the 1936 Summer Olympics
Cyclists from North Holland